Grand Materia is the eighth studio album by Swedish heavy metal band Morgana Lefay.

The album received reviews of 8.5 from Rockhard.de 8/10 from the Swedish webzine Metal Central, as well as reviews from Terrorverlag and Powermetal.de.

Track listing 
All songs composed by Morgana Lefay. Lyrical concept by Charles Rytkönen.

Grand Materia – 5:47
My Funeral Is Calling – 6:25
Only Endless Time Remains – 4:24
Hollow – 4:07
Edge of Mind – 3:54
On the Other Side – 5:08
I Roam – 3:39
Emotional Sanctuary – 6:17
Angel's Deceit – 4:48
The Operation of the Sun – 4:27
Blind – 4:24
My Task Is Done – 6:19

The double vinyl version of the album has the song "Sangreal" as a bonus track.

Credits 
 Charles Rytkönen – vocals
 Tony Eriksson – guitar
 Peter Grehn – guitar & backing vocals
 Fredrik Lundberg – bass & backing vocals
 Robin Engström – drums

References 

Morgana Lefay albums
Albums with cover art by Kristian Wåhlin
2005 albums